Dasylagon is a genus of braconid wasps in the family Braconidae. There are at least two described species in Dasylagon.

Species
These two species belong to the genus Dasylagon:
 Dasylagon aegeriae Muesebeck, 1958 (Colombia)
 Dasylagon simulans Muesebeck, 1958 (Brazil and Honduras)

References

Further reading

 
 
 

Microgastrinae